Knab is a surname. Notable people with the surname include:

Armin Knab (1881–1951), German composer and musical writer
Frederick Knab (1865–1918), artist and entomologist 
Johannes Knab (born 1946), former German cyclist
Ruben Knab (born 1988), Dutch rower
Sebastien Knab, (1632–1690), Roman Catholic prelate
Ursula Knab (1929–1989), German track and field athlete
Werner Knab (1908-1943), German military officer

See also
Knabb